Nathan Aune (born October 27, 1996) is an American soccer player who currently plays for Richmond Kickers in the USL League One.

Career

College and Amateur
Aune spent his entire college soccer career at Seattle University between 2015 and 2018.  He made a total of 65 appearances for the Redhawks and tallied 4 goals and 1 assist.

He also played in the Premier Development League for the Washington Crossfire and Seattle Sounders FC U-23.

Professional
On January 14, 2019, Aune was selected 50th overall in the 2019 MLS SuperDraft by San Jose Earthquakes.

On March 21, 2019, Aune joined San Jose's USL Championship affiliate side Reno 1868.

In January 2020, Aune was announced as part of USL League One club Union Omaha's first-ever batch of signed players. He was released by Omaha following their 2020 season.

Aune joined USL League One side Richmond Kickers on February 18, 2021.

References

External links
Seattle University bio
MLS bio
Reno 1868 bio

1996 births
Living people
American soccer players
Association football defenders
People from Arlington, Washington
Reno 1868 FC players
Richmond Kickers players
San Jose Earthquakes draft picks
Seattle Redhawks men's soccer players
Seattle Sounders FC U-23 players
Soccer players from Washington (state)
Sportspeople from the Seattle metropolitan area
Union Omaha players
USL Championship players
USL League Two players